The 2024 elections in India are expected to include the general election and elections to the Rajya Sabha, to state legislative assemblies, to Panchayats and urban local bodies.

General election

Indian media reporting indicate a national election due in 2024 to constitute the 18th Lok Sabha.

* Tentative schedule per the 17th Lok Sabha tenure.

Rajya sabha

Legislative assembly elections 
Indian media reporting indicate elections for the following legislative assemblies due in 2024.

* Tentative schedule per assembly tenure. Source: Elections in India

See also 
 2023 elections in India
 2024 Rajya Sabha elections
 2025 elections in India

References 

 
Elections in India by year
2024 in India
2024 elections in Asia